This is a list of National Football League kickoff returners who have led the regular season in kickoff return yards each year.

Kick return yards leaders
As per Pro Football Reference and The Football Database.

 New NFL Record

See also
 List of National Football League career kickoff return yards leaders

References

Kickoff return yards leaders
National Football League records and achievements
List of National Football League annual kickoff return yards leaders